Press Pub. Co. v. Monroe, 164 U.S. 105 (1896), was a United States Supreme Court case in which the Court held that the circuit court's decision was valid due to the case's diversity jurisdiction. They dismissed the case because a Supreme Court petition must invoke the Constitution or the laws of the United States, and the common law copyright claim did neither.

References

External links
 

1896 in United States case law
United States Supreme Court cases
United States Supreme Court cases of the Fuller Court
United States copyright case law
Diversity jurisdiction case law